Events from the year 1686 in Sweden

Incumbents
 Monarch – Charles XI

Events
 Establishment of the 1686 års kyrkolag (1686 Church Law), which confirms and describes the rights of the Lutheran Church and confirms Sweden as a Lutheran state: all non-Lutherans are banned from immigration unless the convert to Lutheranism; the Romani people are to be incorporated to the Lutheran Church; the poor care law is regulated; and all parishes is forced by law to learn the children within it to read and write in order to learn the scripture, which closely eradicates illiteracy in Sweden.  
 A Commission is formed to create a new civil code, which eventually leads to the Civil Code of 1734.
 A new law regarding the rights of domestics is issued.
 A reform law allows unmarried women to testify and represent themselves in court despite being legally minors, as the law banning them from doing so is not respected by the courts.
 A church regulation explicitly confirms the common custom of Widow Conservation by stating that a parish vicar is to be chosen first by those candidates willing to marry the widow or daughter of his predecessor. 
 The first Swedish language theater is inaugurated with the Dän Swänska Theatren in Lejonkulan.

Births

Deaths

 26 April - Magnus Gabriel De la Gardie, politician and military (born 1622) 
 8 November - Anders Torstenson, member of the Privy Council, Governor-General of Estonia  (born 1641) 
 unknown - Ingierd Gunnarsdotter, folk ballad singer (died 1601)

References

 
Years of the 17th century in Sweden
Sweden